Berenice Panchrysos (Greek: ,  Steph. B., s. v.; Strabo xvi. 771), was an ancient town of ancient Egypt, near Sabae in the Regio Troglodytica, on the west coast of the Red Sea, between the 20th and 21st degrees of North latitude, in modern-day Sudan. It obtained the appellation of all-golden (Panchrysos) from its vicinity to the gold mines of Jebel Allaqi (Jebel Ollaki), from which the ancient Egyptians drew their principal supplies of that metal, and in the working of which they employed criminals and prisoners of war. (Plin. vi. 34.)

References

External links
Berenice Panchrysos (flickr)

Roman sites in Sudan
Port cities in Sudan
Ptolemaic colonies in the Red Sea
Former populated places in Sudan
Port cities and towns of the Red Sea